This is a list of crossings of Moodna Creek, in Orange County, New York, from its mouth at the Hudson River to its source at the confluence of Cromline Creek and Otter Kill west of Washingtonville.

Transportation in Orange County, New York
Moodna